Nicola Monaghan is an English novelist and author of The Killing Jar, Starfishing and The Okinawa Dragon. She grew up in Nottingham, England, and gave up a career in finance to pursue an MA in creative writing at Nottingham Trent University.

Writing career
Monaghan was listed in The Independent's New Year 2006 list of rising talent and won a Betty Trask Award, the Author's Club Best First Novel Prize and the Waverton Good Read Award for her debut. Her second novel Starfishing and novella The Okinawa Dragon came out in 2008. She has also had stories published in anthologies and magazines, including Sunday Night and Monday Morning (Five Leaves), Cool Brittania (Wachenbach) and online magazine Pulp.Net

Monaghan has written screenplays for Council Child Productions, including "Starcross" and "Margie's Garden."

The Killing Jar
The Killing Jar was Monaghan's first award-winning novel and was inspired by the lives she witnessed on the council estates where she grew up.
New Zealand Listener
The Written Nerd
East London and West Essex Guardian
The Observer
Mslexia
The Independent

Starfishing
Monaghan's second novel was published by Chatto and Windus in March 2008. It is set in the City of London in the late 1990s and concerns Frankie Cavanagh, a LIFFE futures trader, working and playing hard and trying to keep up with the boys. She starts an affair with her boss, Tom, and the two go down a destructive route together. The book is dark, with gothic overtones, and some subtle references to Mary Shelley's Frankenstein. As with Monaghan's previous work, the imagery is rich and very sensual, and the narrative fast-paced. The story takes place as the financial world begins to be taken over by electronic trading on screens and traders struggle to cope with this transition.

The Okinawa Dragon
Monaghan's third book is a novella published by Five Leaves Publications, also in 2008. Again written in a pacey, first-person voice, it tells the story of Jack, a card trader. He is the ultimate alpha male with high powered customers all over the world. One of Jack's richest clients wants to own a very rare trading card, The Okinawa Dragon, but it belongs to a Japanese businessman who is not prepared to sell. Jack travels to Japan to "acquire" the card.

Bibliography
The Killing Jar (2007)
Starfishing (2010)
The Okinawa Dragon (2010)
The Night Lingers and Other Stories (2015)
The Troll: Book 1 (2015)
The Troll: Book 2 (2015)
The Troll: Book 3 (2015)
Dead Flowers (2019)

References

External links
Nicola Monaghan’s website
Questions and Answers with Nicola Monaghan - Hortorian.com
The Betty Trask Awards 
Independent: Rising Stars of 2006
Independent 50 Hot Books summer 2006
The National Academy of Writing

21st-century English novelists
People from Nottingham
Alumni of the University of York
Academics of the University of Nottingham
1971 births
Living people